Krishna Guruvayoorappa is a 1984 Indian Malayalam film, directed by N. P. Suresh and produced by Purushan Alappuzha. The film stars Prem Nazir, Srividya, Menaka, and Unnimary in the lead roles. The film has musical score by V. Dakshinamoorthy.

Cast

Prem Nazir as Poonthanam
Srividya as Kururamma
Shankar as Unni
Menaka as Unni's wife
Unnimary as Savithri
Baby Shalini as Unnikrishnan (Lord Krishna as child)
Balan K. Nair as Melpathur Narayana Bhattathiri
M. G. Soman as Villumangalam Swami
Sathyakala
Shanavas
Meena as Parvathi
Nithya Ravindran as Bhama
Ranipadmini as Charutha
Rajkumar Sethupathi
Kaduvakulam Antony 
Jagannatha Varma as Kunju Nair
Cochin Haneefa as Pandya Rajan
Hari as Namboothirishan
Ravi Menon as Srikrishnan (Lord Krishna as adult)
Seetha as Unni Namboothiri

Soundtrack
The music was composed by V. Dakshinamoorthy and the lyrics were written by Koorkkancheri Sugathan.

References

External links
 

1984 films
1980s Malayalam-language films
Films directed by N. P. Suresh